The 1902 municipal election was held December 8, 1902 for the purpose of electing a mayor and three aldermen to sit on the Edmonton Town Council, as well as five public school trustees and five separate school trustees.  There were six aldermanic positions on the council at the time, but three of them were already filled:  Cornelius Gallagher, Edmund Grierson, and Phillip Heiminck had been elected for two-year terms in 1901, and were still in office.

Voter turnout

Voter turnout figures for the 1902 municipal election are no longer available.

Results

(bold indicates elected, italics indicate incumbent)

Mayor

William Short was acclaimed as mayor.

Aldermen

Daniel Fraser - 200
James Ross - 192
Arthur Cushing - 166
 W H Heathcoate
 Joseph Henri Picard

Vote totals for defeated candidates are no longer available.

Public school trustees

H A Gray, Robert Lee, Kenneth McLeod, Alex Taylor, and Hedley C. Taylor were elected.  Detailed results are no longer available.

Separate (Catholic) school trustees

Nicolas Dubois Dominic Beck, H Morel, Joseph Henri Picard, J Pomerleau, and Antonio Prince were elected.  Detailed results are no longer available.

References

City of Edmonton: Edmonton Elections

1902
1902 elections in Canada
1902 in Alberta